Associação Atlética Santa Cruz is a football (soccer) club in Salinópolis, Pará, Brazil. It was founded on February 1, 2001 and played in amateur football until they became a professional team in 2012.

References

Football clubs in Pará
Association football clubs established in 2001
2001 establishments in Brazil